Berthelinia is a genus of gastropod belonging to the family Juliidae. 

The genus has almost cosmopolitan distribution.

Species:

Berthelinia australis 
Berthelinia babai 
Berthelinia caribbea 
Berthelinia chloris 
Berthelinia corallensis 
Berthelinia darwini 
Berthelinia elegans 
Berthelinia fijiensis 
Berthelinia ganapati 
Berthelinia limax 
 † Berthelinia oligocaenica Janssen, 1979 
Berthelinia pseudochloris 
Berthelinia rottnesti 
Berthelinia schlumbergeri 
Berthelinia singaporensis 
Berthelinia typica 
Berthelinia waltairensis

References

External links
 Le Renard J. (1989). Le genre Namnetia Cossmann 1905: attribution aux Juliidae (Opistobranchia, Gastropoda), définition des espèces et implications paléoécologiques pour l'Eocène de la région de Nantes (Loire-Atlantique). Géologie de la France. 1-2: 21-30

Juliidae
Gastropod genera